Novogumerovo (Yañı Ğümär) is a rural locality (a village) in Starogumerovsky Selsoviet, Kushnarenkovsky District, Bashkortostan, Russia. The population was 121 as of 2010. There is 1 street.

Geography 
Novogumerovo is located 29 km southwest of Kushnarenkovo (the district's administrative centre) by road. Novoakbashevo is the nearest rural locality.

References 

Rural localities in Kushnarenkovsky District